elDiario.es is an online newspaper based in Spain. Founded in 2012 and published only in Spanish, it has been available since 18 September 2012. eldiario.es is managed by Ignacio Escolar, a journalist who was the first editor of Público. eldiario.es includes amongst its staff the former journalists of Público upon cessation of its print edition.

The publication is aimed at a target market of the academic left. The political agenda has been described as "progressive".

License
elDiario.es publishes its contents under a CC-BY-SA license. It contains two exceptions: first, the license does not apply to the content (text, graphics, information, images, and so forth) published by elDiario.es from third parties when assigned or attributed to news agencies (EFE, Europa Press, for instance) or any other company separate from Diario de Prensa Digital, SL. All rights to these contents are strictly reserved to the owner (the agency) and therefore may not be reproduced, distributed, processed or publicly communicated without the express consent of the owner. Moreover, the drawings of the cartoonists are Creative Commons property and may not be reproduced for commercial purposes (CC-BY-NC).

References

Bibliography

External links
 

 
Daily newspapers published in Spain
Spanish-language newspapers
Spanish-language websites
Spanish news websites
Publications established in 2012